Listen Up! The Official 2010 FIFA World Cup Album is  a compilation album with various artists including both local African and international. This album is the official music album of the 2010 FIFA World Cup in South Africa and album was released on 31 May 2010.

Background
The album consists of collaborations between Colombian singer Shakira and Freshlyground, "Waka Waka (This Time for Africa)", Nomvula, Claudia Leitte, R. Kelly, Pitbull. Japanese singer-songwriter Misia is the first Asian artist to participate in the worldwide edition of an official FIFA album. South African teacher/ activist/singer Jpre contributes a revamp of his historical song, "Ke Nako" to the album. Originally recorded and adopted by Mr. Nelson Mandela as his election campaign "theme" song, the 2010 edition features International Superstar Wyclef Jean, 5 Time Grammy Nominee Jazmine Sullivan, and introduces new sensation B. Howard.

Proceeds from the album will benefit FIFA's "20 Centers for 2010", whose aim is to achieve positive social change through football by building twenty Football for Hope centres for public health, education and football across Africa, and other African charities.

Critical reception

Canadian critic Stuart Derdeyn from The Province gave the album a C- and said "Red card for bad taste.[...] This leads to sonic vomit such as Shakira's "Waka Waka (This Time For Africa)," perhaps the stupidest official song for any major sporting event ever. At least the official "anthem" - "Sign of Victory" by R. Kelly and the Soweto Spiritual Singers - is somewhat listenable." Talent Haus fired back to Derdeyn's comments, saying "Calling a work of art from another culture 'vomit' is very disrespectful. Not having an open mind to other types of music that you don't hear in your country does not mean that a song won't be enjoyed globally, and the World Cup is a very global event."

Track listing

Charts

Weekly charts

Year-end charts

Release history

See also
 FIFA World Cup songs and anthems

References

2010 FIFA World Cup
2010 compilation albums
Epic Records compilation albums
FIFA World Cup albums